Bangan Hill National Park is a protected area of the Philippines located in the municipality of Bayombong, Nueva Vizcaya in Cagayan Valley. The park covers an area of 13.90 hectares. It was declared a national park in 1995 by virtue of Republic Act No. 7954.

The park is a historic and cultural landmark of Nueva Vizcaya, being the site of the first mass in the province in 1739 officiated by Father Pedro Freire. The event also marked the founding of the municipality of Bayombong. The park is also the site of the annual "Stations of the Cross" staged by the local Catholic church during the Lenten season using live actors depicting the last moments leading to Jesus Christ's crucifixion. It is also an ideal year-round destination for hiking enthusiasts with the observation deck commanding a great view of the expanse of the surrounding valley formed by the Caraballo and Cordillera Central mountains.

References

See also
List of national parks of the Philippines

National parks of the Philippines
Landforms of Nueva Vizcaya
Hills of the Philippines
Protected areas established in 1995
1995 establishments in the Philippines
Tourist attractions in Nueva Vizcaya